Mauricio Cárdenas Santamaría (born 9 June 1962) is a Colombian economist and politician who served as the 69th Minister of Finance and Public Credit and former Minister of Mines and Energy of Colombia in the administration of President Juan Manuel Santos Calderón. Prior to this, he was a Senior Fellow and Director of the Latin America Initiative at the Brookings Institution.

Early life and education
Born to Jorge Cárdenas Gutiérrez, former President of the National Federation of Coffee Growers of Colombia, and his wife Cecilia Santamaría Botero on 9 June 1962 in Medellín, Antioquia; the third of four children, his other siblings are: Patricia Eugenia, Jorge Hernán, and Eduardo.

Cardenas holds a doctorate in economics from the University of California at Berkeley.

Career
For the Government of Colombia, Cardenas served as the 4th Minister of Economic Development, the 6th Minister of Transport, and former Director of the National Planning Department. As Minister of Finance, he also represented the government on the seven-member board of the country's Central Bank.

In the private sector has served as 11th and 9th Director of the Higher Education and Development Foundation (Fedesarrollo), as the 7th President Latin American and Caribbean Economic Association (LACEA), as former President of Titularizadora Colombiana S.A., and as General Manager of Empresa de Energía de Bogotá S.A. ESP.On 20 September 2011 President Juan Manuel Santos Calderón designated Cárdenas to succeed Juan Carlos Echeverry as Minister of Economy. He was sworn in as the 29th Minister of Mines and Energy on 26 September.

Later career
After leaving government, Cardenas joined various academic institutions. In 2019, he became a Visiting Senior Research Scholar at the Center on Global Energy Policy of Columbia University’s School of International and Public Affairs (SIPA).

Since 2020, Cardenas has been serving as a member of the Independent Panel for Pandemic Preparedness and Response (IPPR), an independent group examining how the World Health Organization (WHO) and countries handled the COVID-19 pandemic, co-chaired by Helen Clark and Ellen Johnson Sirleaf.

Other activities
 Central American Bank for Economic Integration (CABEI), Ex-Officio Member of the Board of Governors (2012-2018)
 Inter-American Investment Corporation (IIC), Ex-Officio Member of the Board of Governors (2012-2018)
 International Monetary Fund (IMF), Ex-Officio Alternate Member of the Board of Governors (2012-2018)
 Multilateral Investment Guarantee Agency (MIGA), World Bank Group, Ex-Officio Member of the Board of Governors (2012-2018)
 World Bank, Ex-Officio Member of the Board of Governors (2012- 2018)

Personal life
On 10 January 1998 Cardenas married Cristina Fernández Mejía in a Catholic wedding at the Santo Toribio de Mogrovejo Church in Cartagena de Indias; together they have three daughters: Isabella, Andrea and Amalia.

References

External links 
 Cárrdenas's work on Latin America at the Brookings Institution

1962 births
Living people
Colombian Conservative Party politicians
Colombian economists
Directors of the National Planning Department of Colombia
People from Medellín
Ministers of Finance and Public Credit of Colombia
Ministers of Mines and Energy of Colombia
UC Berkeley College of Letters and Science alumni
University of Los Andes (Colombia) alumni
Academic staff of the University of Los Andes (Colombia)